Goetz Heinrich Klopfer (born June 25, 1942, in Merseburg, Germany) was a male race walker, who represented the United States at two Summer Olympics, starting in 1968. His best finish was the 10th place in the men's 50 km walk at the 1968 Summer Olympics in Mexico City. He won the 20 km event at the 1971 Pan American Games.

References
 

1942 births
Living people
American male racewalkers
Athletes (track and field) at the 1967 Pan American Games
Athletes (track and field) at the 1968 Summer Olympics
Athletes (track and field) at the 1971 Pan American Games
Athletes (track and field) at the 1972 Summer Olympics
Olympic track and field athletes of the United States
German emigrants to the United States
Pan American Games gold medalists for the United States
Pan American Games bronze medalists for the United States
Pan American Games medalists in athletics (track and field)
Medalists at the 1967 Pan American Games
Medalists at the 1971 Pan American Games